Unión Rugby Almería Playcar is a Spanish rugby team based in Almería.
He currently plays in the Division de Honor B of Spain, in group C.

External links
UR Almería

Spanish rugby union teams
Sport in Almería
Sports teams in Andalusia
Rugby clubs established in 2013